Vallis Planck is a long, linear valley located on the far side of the Moon. It is oriented radially to the huge Schrödinger basin, and was most likely formed by that impact.

This cleft in the surface crosses the western part of the huge walled plain Planck, and it was named after that feature (which has an eponym of Max Planck). The southern edge closest to Schrödinger begins near the northeastern outer rampart of the crater Grotrian. It then continues to the north-northwest, where it suffers a disruption where it crosses the crater Fechner. The remainder of the feature continues to the northwestern outer rim of the walled plain Planck, until terminating near Pikel'ner K.

References 
 http://www.planetenkunde.de/p012/p01204/p01204180008.htm

Planck, Vallis